The 2016 Spa-Francorchamps GP2 Series round was a GP2 Series motor race held on 27 and 28 August 2016 at the Circuit de Spa-Francorchamps in Belgium. It was the eighth round of the 2016 GP2 Series. The race weekend supported the 2016 Belgian Grand Prix.

Background
Sergio Canamasas announced his return to Carlin for the round, replacing René Binder

Report

Qualifying
Antonio Giovinazzi led a Prema Racing 1-2 in qualifying, once again showcasing Prema's run of dominance in GP2 as of late. Gustav Malja proved the surprise candidate for third, albeit half a second adrift of Giovinazzi.

Notes
1. – Jeffri was given a grid penalty from the previous round in Hockenheim, after having been deemed to have caused a collision.

Feature Race
Pierre Gasly took another win with a dominant performance and with rival Sergey Sirotkin absent from the podium, he stretched his lead in the standings. Brits Jordan King and Alex Lynn took second and third respectively, comfortably ahead of the Russian Time pair of Raffaele Marciello and Artem Markelov

Sprint Race
Antonio Giovinazzi took the sprint race win to complete a dominant weekend for the Prema Racing outfit. Gustav Malja finished in second to record his best finish in GP2 and Luca Ghiotto achieved third for the Trident team.

Notes
1. – Lynn, King, Pic, de Jong, Jeffri, Erikkson and Sirotkin were all given ten-second penalties after being found guilty of using their DRS on lap one.

Standings after the round

Drivers' Championship standings

Teams' Championship standings

 Note: Only the top five positions are included for both sets of standings.

See also 
 2016 Belgian Grand Prix
 2016 Spa-Francorchamps GP3 Series round

References

External links 
 Official website of GP2 Series

2016
GP2
August 2016 sports events in Europe
Spa-Francorchamps